Paso de Ovejas (Spanish: Sheep's Crossway) is a city in the Mexican state of Veracruz. 
It serves as the municipal seat for the surrounding municipality of the same name.

Paso de Ovejas is bordered by 
La Antigua, Veracruz, and Puente Nacional. 
It is on the railroad and on 
Federal Highways 180 and 190. José Cardel Murrieta was born in Paso de Ovejas and died in 
Mexico City.

The city of Paso de Ovejas, along with the city of Catemaco, Veracruz, was one of two cities used for most of the filming of Apocalypto (a 2006 film produced by Mel Gibson).

Populated places in Veracruz